The All Nepal National Independent Students Union (Revolutionary) or ANNISU (R) is the student wing of the Communist Party of Nepal-Maoist, a political party in Nepal. It is also referred as All Nepal National Free Students Union-Revolutionary ANNFSU-R.

The current President of the ANNISU (R) is Pancha Singh.

Violence 

MCC compact entered Nepal during the premiership of Bhattarai while a committee was formed during second premiership of Dahal to rectify MCC. During premiership of Bhattarai, Barsaman Pun was the finance minister while Krishna Bahadur Mahara was the finance minister during premiership of Dahal. Maoist leaders Matrika Prasad Yadav, Bina Magar, Shakti Bahadur Basnet, Giriraj Mani Pokharel and Ram Bahadur Thapa were part of Second Oli cabinet which took MCC to parliament. At the time, they had given approval to table MCC.

Party president Prachanda publicly maintained that the Millennium Challenge Corporation's (MCC) Nepal Compact could not be ratified without amending certain clauses. It was found that he was in favor of ratification as it was. MCC later released the letter dated September 29, 2021, in which Prachanda and Prime Minister of Nepal Sher Bahadur Deuba assured MCC that the compact would be ratified within four to five months. Major national newspapers criticized Prachanda's move, saying it would deteriorate Nepal's diplomatic strength and virtue.

They reported that it was dual nature of the party to both stay in government and protest at the same time for personal profit and vote swing. This move was highly criticized by people and medias.

The party chairman had given approval to table MCC while several fellow politicians stood in opposition to the chairman's decision. They called for protests even on streets. Many police were attacked. Trees were broken, the blocks of footpath were removed to attack police as shown in picture. The branches of trees were broken. The Maoist cadets destroyed a boutique while the owner was saving police. Government had to pay for the loss. Leader of opposition and chairman of Communist Party of Nepal (Unified Marxist–Leninist), KP Sharma Oli of condemned the decision of Maoists to stay in government while destroying public property at the same time. The Home Minister of Nepal, Bal Krishna Khan's and Prime minister asked the protesters to stay calm and not destroy public properties casing loss to the government and economy.

See also
 Nepal Revolutionary Students' Union
 All Nepal National Free Students Union (Unified)
 Nepal Progressive Student Federation

References 

Student wings of political parties in Nepal
Student wings of communist parties
Students' unions in Nepal
Maoist organisations in Nepal
Communist Party of Nepal (Maoist Centre)
Students' unions